Kalateh-ye Nazar Mohammad (also Romanized as Kalāteh-ye Naz̧ar Moḩammad; also known as Naz̧ar Moḩammad) is a village in Jirestan Rural District, Sarhad District, Shirvan County, North Khorasan Province, Iran. At the 2006 census, its population was 714, in 144 families.

References 

Populated places in Shirvan County